Giichi Arima (有馬　義一)(September, 1911 - July 3, 1993) was a baseball player in Japan. He played for the Taiyo Whales (now the Yokohama DeNA BayStars) in the Japan Central League, and also managed them for part of 1951.

References 

1911 births
1993 deaths
Managers of baseball teams in Japan
Yokohama DeNA BayStars managers